Movile Cave is a cave near Mangalia, Constanța County, Romania discovered in 1986 by Cristian Lascu a few kilometers from the Black Sea coast. It is notable for its unique groundwater ecosystem abundant in hydrogen sulfide and carbon dioxide, but low in oxygen. Life in the cave has been separated from the outside for the past 5.5 million years and it is based completely on chemosynthesis rather than photosynthesis.

Similar caves where life partly or fully depends on chemosynthesis have been found in Ein-Nur Cave and Ayalon Cave (Israel), Frasassi Caves (Italy), Melissotrypa Cave (Greece), Tashan Cave (Iran), caves in the Sharo-Argun Valley in the Caucasus Mountains, Lower Kane Cave and Cesspool Cave (USA), and Villa Luz Cave (Mexico).

Description 
The temperature of the air and water is a constant 21°C (70°F) and the relative humidity is about 100%. The cave is closed to the general public, and only a few researchers are permitted inside each year, to minimize disturbance to the delicate ecosystem.

Chemical environment
The air in the cave is very different from the outer atmosphere. The level of oxygen is only a third to half of the concentration found in open air (7–10% O2 in the cave atmosphere, compared to 21% O2 in air), and about one hundred times more carbon dioxide (2–3.5% CO2 in the cave atmosphere, versus 0.04% CO2 in air). It also contains 1–2% methane (CH4) and both the air and waters of the cave contain high concentrations of hydrogen sulfide (H2S) and ammonia (NH3). The water in the lake only contains dissolved oxygen for the first centimeter, at most, and in some places only the first millimeter. Deeper down the lake water becomes completely anoxic.

Biology
The cave is known to contain 57 animal species, among them leeches, spiders, pseudoscorpions, woodlice,
a centipede,
a water scorpion (Nepa anophthalma), and also a snail. 
Of these, 37 are endemic.
The food chain is based on chemosynthesis by methane- and sulfur-oxidizing bacteria, which in turn release nutrients for fungi and other bacteria. This forms microbial mats on the cave walls and the surface of lakes and ponds which are grazed on by some of the animals. The grazers are then preyed on by predatory species. Nepa anophthalma is the only known cave-adapted water scorpion in the world. While animals have lived in the cave for 5.5 million years, not all of them arrived simultaneously. One of the most recent animals recorded is the cave's only species of snail, Heleobia dobrogica, which has inhabited the cave for slightly more than 2 million years.

See also
Hydrothermal vent microbial communities
Troglofauna
Stygofauna

References

General references
 Jean Balthazar: Grenzen unseres Wissens. Orbis Verlag, München 2003, Seite 268, .

Inline citations

External links
 The Movile Cave Project at web.archive.org
 La Grotte de Movile (fr.)
 Papers published about Movile Cave
 Life in Hell – Survivors of Darkness. Mona Lisa Production, France

Caves of Romania
Geography of Constanța County
Ecosystems
Endemism